Christos Koliantris (born 30 March 1964) is a retired Cypriot football midfielder.

References

1964 births
Living people
Cypriot footballers
AEL Limassol players
Association football midfielders
Cyprus international footballers